There are many $20 banknotes, bills or coins, including:

 Australian twenty-dollar note
 Canadian twenty-dollar bill
 New Zealand twenty-dollar note
 United States twenty-dollar bill
 Nicaraguan twenty-cordoba note
 One of the banknotes of the Hong Kong dollar
 One of the banknotes of Zimbabwe

Other currencies that issue $20 banknotes, bills or coins are: